Tool Academy 2 is the second season of the VH1 reality television series Tool Academy. Tool Academy 2 is a competitive reality television show featuring twelve "unsuspecting bad boys" who have been sent to "relationship boot camp". The second season premiered on August 30, 2009.

The men, all of whom have been nominated by their respective girlfriends, initially think they are taking part in a competition for the title of "International Party King" for Her energy drink. However, shortly after arriving they find out the truth: they are actually being entered into a "charm school" which focuses on teaching them how to behave as boyfriends. Each week, one contestant is eliminated and his girlfriend must choose whether or not to stay with him. The last contestant remaining will win a $100,000 prize and the title of "Mr. Awesome." Relationship counselor Trina Dolenz helps the contestants with their relationship problems and decides who is expelled.

The winner for the second season was T Shaw (Terry) and Nicole. T Shaw proposed to Nicole after winning the competition.

Lessons of the Week
Badges
  Dedication
  Fidelity
  Modesty
  Appreciation
  Maturity
  Communication
  Trust
  Romance
  Family Values
  Commitment

Contestants

Episode progress

 The contestant won Tool Academy and the title "Mr. Awesome"
 The contestant won a challenge and won a date with his girlfriend.
 The contestant won a challenge, won a date with his girlfriend, and was first to receive a badge.
 The contestant was the first to receive a badge.
 The contestant was safe from being eliminated.
 The contestant won a challenge and won a date with his girlfriend, but was at risk of being eliminated
 The contestant was at risk of being eliminated.
 The contestant won a challenge, won a date with his girlfriend, and was eliminated
 The contestant was eliminated and his girlfriend decided to stay with him.
 The contestant was eliminated and his girlfriend decided to leave him.
 The contestant was eliminated and decided to leave his girlfriend.
 The contestant was brought back as part of the jury.

Episodes

Episode 1
Original Broadcast - First aired August 30, 2009
Lesson of the Week: Dedication
Challenge: Testing their dedication from Relationship
Challenge Reward: A romantic dinner
Challenge Winner: Justin "J Daddy" and Kathleen
Bottom 3: John L., Josh, Stew
Eliminated: Josh (Jamie decided to stay with Josh)
Episode Notes: After being eliminated, Josh did not go out the main door to meet his girlfriend, Jamie. He said that he would not go out and make himself look like an idiot being the first one to leave. The producer and head of security gave him chances to walk out, saying he was now trespassing, but Josh refused so he was forcibly removed by security, when even there, he hesitated. Jordan ran out, yelling at Josh that he had to leave ("You're a tool, you've been expelled, get the fuck out!"). Security led him out the backway. Josh and Jamie wouldn't leave because Josh wanted the car to be brought to him. Jamie decided to stay with Josh after he said "honest" to her, letting her know he was telling the truth.

Episode 2Original Broadcast - First aired September 6, 2009Lesson of the Week: Fidelity
Challenge: Choreographing a cheer on the good and bad of their relationship
Challenge Reward: Sexy Photoshoot and Hot Date
Challenge Winner: Stew and Amanda
Bottom 3: Dan, Dre P., and Jon S.
Eliminated: Jon S. (Jon S. decided to leave Tracey)

Episode 3First aired September 20, 2009Lesson of the Week: Modesty
Challenge: Beet Farmers
Challenge Reward: Drive-in movie
Bottom 3: John L., Charm, J Daddy
Eliminated: J Daddy (Kathleen decided to leave J Daddy)
Episode Notes: Despite a somewhat strong showing in the previous episodes, J Daddy took neither the mirror exercise, nor the beet picking challenge seriously. Also, Kat and Leah revealed that they work as strippers, which ignited an argument over "ruining happy homes" from Shannon.

Episode 4First aired September 27, 2009Lesson of the Week: Appreciation
Challenge: The tools must watch their girls go on dates with true gentlemen.
Bottom 3: John L., Frank, Mike A.

Episode 5First aired October 4, 2009Lesson of the Week: Maturity
Challenge: Delivering eggs to the "nest".
Challenge Reward: Romantic Dinner
Challenge Winner: T Shaw (Terry) and Nicole
Bottom 3: Stew, T Shaw (Terry), John L.
Eliminated: John L. (Sarah decided to stay with John L.)
Episode Notes: The reason for John L.'s elimination was his lack of maturity and his loss of temper, resulting in the damage of school property. He had promised to calm down and not lose his temper as much, but proved he was not able to do so. Terry was almost eliminated because during the therapy session, he blamed his problems on Nicole once again and made excuses. Also, during the challenge, he was more focused on winning than helping Nicole. At the end of the challenge, Shealyn had a sharp pain in her chest. While being checked by the paramedics, Tyler stayed with her the whole time. Therefore, he was first to receive his Maturity badge.

Episode 6First aired October 11, 2009Lesson of the Week: Communication
Challenge: Build A Living Room
Challenge Reward: Flat Screen TV, Conjugal Visit Room
Challenge Winner: Tyler and shealyn
Eliminated: Dan (Shannon decided to stay with Dan)
Bottom 3: Charm, Dre P., Frank
Eliminated: Dre P. (Leah decided to stay with Dre P.)
Episode Notes: This episode had a double elimination.
Reason for Dan's elimination: He couldn't give clear instructions to Shannon, during the challenge, and yelled at her.
Reason for Dre P.'s elimination: He and Leah were like bombs and they couldn't control their anger.

Episode 7First aired October 18, 2009Lesson of the Week: Trust
Challenge: Lie Detector Test, Obstacle Course
Challenge Reward: Romantic Date
Challenge Winner: Stew
Bottom 2: Charm, Frank
Eliminated: Frank (Christina decided to leave Frank)

Episode 8First aired October 25, 2009Lesson of the Week: Romance
Challenge: Camping Trip
Challenge Reward: Date (How it was set is determined depending on how they place)
Challenge Winner: Tyler and Shay (1st), Stew and Amanda (2nd), T-Shaw (Terry) and Nicole(3rd), Charm and Andrea (Last)
Bottom: Charm, Stew
Eliminated: Charm (Andrea decided to stay with Charm)

Episode 9First aired November 1, 2009Lesson of the Week: Family Values
Special Guests: The Tools and Girlfriends Parents
Challenge: Taking Care of Piglets
To Do: Catch, Feed, Clean, Change the Piglets
Challenge Reward: None (Girlfriend, Parent, Tool Baby Shower)
Challenge Winner: No One
Bottom 3: Stew, T Shaw, Tyler
Eliminated: Stew (Amanda decided to stay with Stew)

Episode 10First aired November 8, 2009''

Final Lesson: Commitment
Challenge: Clean Mini Van
Challenge Reward: Romantic Date
Challenge Winner: Tyler and Shealyn
Special Guests: Charm, Frank, Stew
Runner-Up: Tyler (Shealyn decided to stay with Tyler)
Winner: T Shaw (Nicole and T Shaw got engaged)

References

External links
Official Site

2009 American television seasons